This is a list of châteaux in France, arranged by region.

The French word château (plural: châteaux) has a wider meaning than the English castle: it includes architectural entities that are properly called palaces, mansions or vineyards in English.

List of former regions 
 List of châteaux in Eure-et-Loir
 Châteaux of the Loire Valley

See also 
 List of castles
 List of castles in France

 
Châteaux